The 2008 FIM Nordicbet Speedway World Cup (SWC) is the 8th FIM Speedway World Cup season. The Final took place on July 19 2008 in Vojens, Denmark. The tournament was won by host team Denmark (49 pts) and they beat defending champion Poland (46 pts), Sweden (39 pts) and Australia (21 pts) in the Final.

It was the second time the Speedway World Cup was won by Denmark and their thirteenth Team World Champion title overall. It was the second time Hans Andersen, Niels Kristian Iversen, Bjarne Pedersen and Nicki Pedersen had been members of a  World Cup winning team (Champions in 2006, but it was the first time for Kenneth Bjerre.

Calendar

Qualification

The top 6 teams of the overall 2007 Speedway World Cup was directly seeded into the 2008 SWC Final Tournament: Poland (Rank #1 - the defending Champion), Denmark (#2), Australia (#3), Great Britain (#4), Sweden (#5) and Russia (#6). 2 other teams was shall qualify to the SWC through 2 preliminary rounds: Czech Republic (#7) and Hungary (#8).

In Preliminary Round 1 in Miskolc, Hungary won with (51+3 points) after a run-off between Matej Ferjan and Tobias Kroner from Germany (51+2 pts). The last places were taken by Latvia (36 pts) and United States (12 pts) competing without Grand Prix rider Greg Hancock.

In Ljubljana, Slovenia rode Preliminary Round 2 which was won by the Czech Republic team (59 points). They beat Finland (40 pts), Slovenia (35 pts) and Italy (16 pts).

Tournament

The SWC Final Tournament was held by Poland (Event 1), Great Britain (Event 2) and Denmark (Race-Off and The Final).

The first Semi-Final (Event 1) was held in Leszno, Poland. This meeting was won by Australia (56+3 points) after a Run-Off between Leigh Adams and Jarosław Hampel from Poland (56+2 points). In Event 2 in Coventry, Great Britain, the Denmark team won (63 points).

The Race-Off and the Final were held in Vojens, Denmark. The Swedish team won the Race-Off(53 points). Sweden and Poland (50 points) qualified for the Final. The last two places were taken by Great Britain (36 points) and Russia (17 points).

In the Finale the Denmark team won (49 points). They beat Poland (46), Sweden (39) and Australia (21).

Final classification

See also
 2008 Speedway Grand Prix
 2008 Team Speedway Junior World Championship

References

 
World Team
2008